Babatunde Aléshé is a British actor, comedian and writer. He is known for appearing on Celebrity Gogglebox, and the 22nd series of British television series I'm a Celebrity...Get Me Out of Here!.

Career
Aléshé has performed at the Soho Theatre, the Shaw Theatre, the O2 and the Hackney Empire.

As an actor, Aléshé has featured in Law & Order: UK, New Tricks, Doctor Who, Pelican Blood, Waking the Dead, EastEnders and Frankie. As himself, he has appeared on Celebrity Gogglebox, Soccer AM, Steph's Packed Lunch, the Weakest Link and Richard Osman's House of Games. 

In 2022, Aléshé participated in the 22nd series of ITV's I'm a Celebrity...Get Me Out of Here!. He came 7th, after spending 18 days in the jungle.

Awards
He has won the Amused Moose National New Comic Award (2019) and Best Newcomer at the Black Entertainment Comedy Awards.

Filmography

References

External links

British male television actors
Year of birth missing (living people)
British stand-up comedians
Black British people
British male comedians
Living people
I'm a Celebrity...Get Me Out of Here! (British TV series) participants